Estadio Olímpico Hermanos Ghersi Páez is a multi-use stadium in Maracay, Venezuela.  It is currently used mostly for football matches and is the home stadium of Aragua Fútbol Club.   The stadium holds 14,000 people.

References

Olimpico Hermanos Ghersi Paez
Buildings and structures in Aragua
Buildings and structures in Maracay
Athletics (track and field) venues in Venezuela